Tan Sri William Cheng Heng Jem or William H.J. Cheng (born 1943) is the chairman of Lion Group Malaysia, a conglomerate having diversified businesses encompassing retail, property development, mining, steel, agriculture and computer. He is known for introducing the Parkson department store chain in 1987.

Tan Sri Cheng previously served as the President of both The Associated Chinese Chambers of Commerce and Industry of Malaysia (“ACCCIM”) and The Chinese Chamber of Commerce and Industry of Kuala Lumpur and Selangor ("KLSCCCI”) and is now a Life Honorary President of ACCCIM and KLSCCCI. And director of Andalas Development Sdn Bhd.

Cheng is the largest shareholder of Parkson Holdings, which have more than 100 department stores in Malaysia, China, Vietnam and Indonesia. And assumed Parkson Retail Asia Ltd (PRA) executive position after his nephew Datuk Alfred Cheng stepped down as managing director in May 2013.

Honour

Honour of Malaysia
  : Commander of the Order of Loyalty to the Crown of Malaysia (P.S.M.) (1991)

References

External links
Forbes Profile

Living people
1943 births
Malaysian chairpersons of corporations
Malaysian businesspeople
Malaysian people of Chinese descent
Commanders of the Order of Loyalty to the Crown of Malaysia
Malaysian people of Teochew descent